= 4/6 =

4/6 may refer to:

- April 6 (month-day date notation)
- June 4 (day-month date notation)
- 4 shillings and 6 pence in UK predecimal currency
